Narasingapalli (or Narasingibilly) is a village in Anakapalli district of the Indian state of Andhra Pradesh. It is situated in Kasimkota mandal of Anakapalli revenue division .

Geography

Demographics

 census, Narasingapalli had a population of 1,629. The total population constitute, 786 males and 843 females —a sex ratio of 1073 females per 1000 males. 195 children are in the age group of 0–6 years, of which 99 are boys and 96 are girls. The average literacy rate stands at 53.35% with 765 literates, significantly lower than the state average of 67.41%.

Transport

Narasingapalli railway station provides rail connectivity to the village.

References

Villages in Anakapalli district